John Michael Uhrich (June 7, 1877 – June 15, 1951), was the ninth Lieutenant Governor of Saskatchewan from 1948 until 1951.

Early life
Uhrich was born in Formosa, Ontario and received his schooling in Walkerton and was briefly a schoolteacher before earning his medical degree at Northwestern University in Chicago.

During his summer breaks from university he would teach school in Saskatchewan. After graduation, he decided to settle in the province and established his medical practice at Hague, Saskatchewan in 1909.

Politics
He entered politics and was elected to the Legislative Assembly of Saskatchewan in the 1921 provincial election as the Liberal MLA for Rosthern.

Uhrich was appointed to the provincial cabinet in 1922 by Premier Charles Dunning and served as provincial secretary until 1923 when he was appointed the province's first Minister of Public Health. Under Uhrich the province expanded its role in the hospital system, which had been largely locally run to that point, and increased the number of hospitals. He also began public inspection of water and milk supplies and immunization programs against diphtheria and smallpox. In 1929, the government assumed the cost of treating tuberculosis.

After being re-elected in the 1925 provincial election the Liberal government was defeated in 1929 and Uhrich, who was personally re-elected, moved to the opposition benches.

The Liberals returned to power in 1934 and Uhrich again became Minister of Public Health. In 1938, he was given the additional portfolio of Public Works.

Later life
He retired from politics in 1944 and was appointed lieutenant governor in 1948. He died, in office, in 1951.

References
Uhrich, John Michael, Encyclopedia of Saskatchewan

1877 births
1951 deaths
Lieutenant Governors of Saskatchewan
Members of the Executive Council of Saskatchewan
Saskatchewan Liberal Party MLAs
Physicians from Saskatchewan
Feinberg School of Medicine alumni